Stigmella erysibodea is a species of moth in the family Nepticulidae. It is endemic to New Zealand.

The length of the forewings is 3–4 mm.

The larvae feed on Olearia ilicifolia and Olearia albida. They mine the leaves of their host plants.

References

External links
Fauna of New Zealand - Number 16: Nepticulidae (Insecta: Lepidoptera)

Nepticulidae
Moths of New Zealand
Endemic fauna of New Zealand
Moths described in 1989
Endemic moths of New Zealand